Paul Coghlan (born 1 June 1944) is an Irish former Fine Gael politician who served as Leas-Chathaoirleach of Seanad Éireann from June 2016 to March 2020, and a Senator for the Industrial and Commercial Panel from September 1997 to March 2020.

Coghlan unsuccessfully contested the 1992 general election in the Kerry South, constituency. He then stood on the Agricultural Panel in the election to the 20th Seanad, but did not win a seat.

In 1997 he was elected to the 21st Seanad by the Industrial and Commercial Panel, and re-elected in 2002 to the 22nd Seanad, where he was Fine Gael spokesperson on Enterprise, Trade and Employment. He was re-elected in 2007 to the 23rd Seanad, again by the Industrial and Commercial Panel.

Born in Killarney and still resident in Kerry, he is a member and former President of Killarney Chamber of Commerce. He was a founding director of Radio Kerry and is a trustee and former Chairman of Muckross House. He is also a member of the Institute of Bankers in Ireland, the Life Assurance Association and the Institute of Professional Auctioneers and Valuers.

Coghlan was previously a member of Kerry County Council, Killarney Town Council and the Dingle Harbour Commissioners.

Coghlan was a member of the British–Irish Parliamentary Assembly and a member of the committee on the implementation of the Good Friday Agreement. He retired from politics in 2020 and did not contest the 2020 Seanad election.

References

External links

1944 births
Living people
Fine Gael senators
Irish auctioneers
Local councillors in County Kerry
Members of the 21st Seanad
Members of the 22nd Seanad
Members of the 23rd Seanad
Members of the 24th Seanad
Members of the 25th Seanad
People from Killarney
Politicians from County Kerry